Frontenac—Lennox and Addington was a federal electoral district represented in the House of Commons of Canada from 1968 to 1979. It was located in the province of Ontario. This riding was created in 1966 from parts of Hastings—Frontenac, Kingston, Lanark, Prince Edward—Lennox, Renfrew North and Renfrew South ridings.

It consisted of:
 in the county of Frontenac: the Townships of Barrie, Bedford, North Canonto, South Canonto, Clarendon, Hinchinbrooke, Kennebec, Loughborough, Miller, Olden, Oso, Palmerston, Portland and Storrington, and the north east part of the Township of Pittsburgh;
 in the County of Lanark: the Townships of Bathurst, Dalhousie, Lavant, North Sherbrooke and South Sherbrooke;
 in the County of Lennox and Addington: the Townships of Abinger, Adolphustown, Anglesea, Ashby, Camden, Denbigh, Effingham, Ernestown, North Fredericksburgh, South Fredericksburgh, Kaladar, Richmond and Sheffield;
 in the County of Renfrew: the Townships of North Algona, South Algona, Brougham, Brudenell, Grattan, Griffith, Hagarty, Lyndoch, Matawatchan, Radcliffe, Raglan, geden, Sebastopol and Wilberforce.

The electoral district was abolished in 1976 when it was redistributed between Hastings—Frontenac, Kingston and the Islands, Lanark—Renfrew—Carleton and Renfrew—Nipissing—Pembroke ridings.

Members of Parliament

This riding has elected the following Members of Parliament:

Election results

  

   

|}

|}

See also 

 List of Canadian federal electoral districts
 Past Canadian electoral districts

External links 
Riding history from the Library of Parliament

Former federal electoral districts of Ontario